The Lacombe Generals were a Senior AAA ice hockey team from Lacombe, Alberta, Canada that played in the Chinook Hockey League.  The Generals are four-time national champions, having won the Allan Cup in 2009 and 2016 in Steinbach, Manitoba, and in 2013 in Red Deer, Alberta and in Lacombe, Alberta 2019. The club was formerly known as the Bentley Generals from 1999–2016, and played out of the Bentley Arena in Bentley, Alberta, as well as the Red Deer Arena. The team folded in 2019 due to concerns with the organization of senior hockey in Canada.

History
The Bentley Generals hockey club was formed in 1999 and began play in the Chinook Hockey League. The team won its first provincial senior 'A' title in 2001.  The following year, the Generals registered as an 'AAA' club and competed in the Allan Cup playdowns for the first time. Former NHLer Kelly Buchberger was a member of the Generals in 2005, while the team also attempted to play Ryan Smyth during the 2004–05 NHL lockout, though Smyth was ruled ineligible to play.

The Generals, coached by former National Hockey League player and coach Brian Sutter, qualified for the Allan Cup for the first time in 2007.

In 2009, the Generals, once again coached by Sutter, won their first Allan Cup with a 4-3 win in double overtime over Manitoba's Southeast Prairie Thunder.  In 2013, the Generals hosted the Allan Cup in Red Deer, Alberta and captured their second title by defeating Newfoundland's Clarenville Caribous 3-0 in the championship game.  The Generals returned to Steinbach in 2016 and defeated the host Prairie Thunder again by a score of 4-3 in overtime to win their third Allan Cup.  In 2019, the Generals won their fourth Allan Cup defeating the Innisfail Eagles 5-2 in  the final game. The Generals have been Allan Cup finalist six other times: 2008, 2010, 2011, 2015, 2017, and 2018.

In December 2015 it was announced that the Generals were relocating to Lacombe, Alberta for the 2016–17 season, citing a drop in attendance as a reason for the move. The partnership with the City of Lacombe was made official in the summer of 2016. The Generals played in the newly renovated Gary Moe Auto Group Sportsplex in the Can Pak Ice Complex, formerly known as the Barnett Arenas.

The move wasn't the only change the Generals would make for the 2016–17 season. In July 2016 it was announced head coach Ryan Tobler would be stepping down to work as an assistant coach with the ECHL's Colorado Eagles. In August 2016, it was announced longtime Generals player Curtis Austring would be Tobler's successor.

After hosting, and winning, the Allan Cup in 2019, the Generals announced they would cease operations. The reasons given cited concerns with the organization of Allan Cup Hockey West, the league they belonged to: several teams had withdrawn recently making it difficult to sustain play.

Season-by-season record (Regular season)
''Note: GP = Games played, W = Wins, L = Losses, T = Ties, OTL = Overtime losses, Pts = Points, GF = Goals for, GA = Goals against

Allan Cup Championships  = 4 (2009, 2013, 2016, 2019)
Allan Cup Finals  = 10 (2008, 2009, 2010, 2011, 2013, 2015, 2016, 2017, 2018, 2019)
Allan Cup Appearances    = 13 (2004, 2007, 2008, 2009, 2010, 2011, 2013, 2014, 2015, 2016, 2017, 2018, 2019)

NHL alumni
Travis Brigley
Jeremy Colliton
Trent Hunter
Brian Sutter (Coach)
Peter Vandermeer
Darren Van Impe
Craig Weller
Ryan Tobler
Drew Bagnall
Brennan Evans
Evan Oberg
Terry Ryan
Jeff Deslauriers
Kyle Greentree
Tyler Weiman

References

External links
Official website
Chinook Hockey League
Team Profile at Eliteprospects.com

2019 disestablishments in Alberta
Defunct ice hockey teams in Alberta
Lacombe, Alberta
Senior ice hockey teams
Ice hockey clubs disestablished in 2019
1999 establishments in Alberta
Ice hockey clubs established in 1999